KQHN (97.3 FM, "Q97.3") is a hot adult contemporary radio station licensed to Waskom, Texas, and serves the greater Shreveport, Louisiana area.

The station is owned by Cumulus Media and broadcasts from the Louisiana Boardwalk shopping center in Bossier City, Louisiana, along with sister stations KRMD, KRMD-FM, KMJJ, and KVMA-FM.

The station was assigned the KQHN call letters by the Federal Communications Commission on April 7, 2005.

History
The station was originally licensed to Magnolia, Arkansas, as KFMV on 107.9 MHz.

In 2004, Cumulus Media bought the station and tried to move the station into the Shreveport market, by moving the station's city of license to Oil City, Louisiana. However the station's transmitter on 107.9 MHz from its new location caused interference with air traffic control at Barksdale Air Force Base and was forced off the air by the military and FCC. Ultimately the station's frequency was moved to 97.3 MHz and the city of license to Waskom, Texas. Although the transmitter is located in Shreveport, the city of license is for Waskom, Texas, and serves the Ark-La-Tex area. The transmitter is located near downtown Shreveport on a landmark non-supported structure nicknamed Eiffel Tower. KQHN-FM transmit facilities are co-located with KVMA-FM, KMJJ-FM and KRMD-AM with KRMD-FM auxiliary site.

When the station relocated to Shreveport and 97.3 in early 2005 under new callsign KQHN, it began testing the new signal with a stunt loop of "Swans Splashdown" by Jean-Jacques Perrey. On April 7, 2005, KQHN flipped to Hot AC as "Mix 97.3". The first song on Mix was "Better Days" by Goo Goo Dolls.
On April 13, 2012, at Noon, KQHN flipped to Top 40, branded as "i97-3".

On September 14, 2017, KQHN changed their format from top 40 to hot adult contemporary, branded as "Q97.3".

References

External links
KQHN official website

QHN
Hot adult contemporary radio stations in the United States
Cumulus Media radio stations
Harrison County, Texas